Ralph Spence can refer to:

 Ralph Spence (bishop) (born 1942), Canadian bishop
 Ralph Spence (screenwriter) (1890-1949), American screenwriter
 Ralph Spence (trade unionist) (died 1938), British trade union leader